Terence Patrick "Terry" Jeffrey (born July 26, 1958) is an American journalist, author and political commentator. He was an editorial writer for The Washington Times and the editor of Human Events, a US conservative weekly newspaper since converted to a website. Since 2007, he has been the editor-in-chief of CNSNews. He also writes a weekly column for the Creators Syndicate.

Jeffrey was the research and issues director for Pat Buchanan's 1992 presidential campaign and the national campaign manager for Buchanan's 1996 presidential campaign. In between the two Buchanan campaigns, Jeffrey was executive director of Buchanan's foundation, The American Cause.

Jeffrey was born in San Francisco, California, and graduated in 1981 from Princeton University in New Jersey. He also studied Arabic at the American University in Cairo in 1984–85; and, in 1986–87, he studied in the Masters of Arts in Arab Studies program at Georgetown University, but he did not earn a degree.

In July 2010, the publisher Regnery released his book, Control Freaks: 7 Ways Liberals Plan to Ruin Your Life.

External links
CNSNews.com Staff Bio

1959 births
Living people
American magazine editors
The Washington Times people
Human Events people
American columnists
American male journalists
American political writers
American political commentators
21st-century American historians
21st-century American male writers
Princeton University alumni
Writers from San Francisco
Virginia Republicans
People from Falls Church, Virginia
People from Washington, D.C.
Date of birth missing (living people)
Historians from Virginia
Historians from California
American male non-fiction writers